The Dow Jones Utility Average (DJUA, also known as the "Dow Jones Utilities") is a stock index from S&P Dow Jones Indices that tracks  the performance of 15 prominent utility companies traded in the United States.

Components

, the current components on the Dow Jones Utilities are as follows (company name followed by ticker symbol):

Effective October 1, 2014, American Water Works replaced Williams Companies.

Effective January 18, 2019, Sempra Energy replaced PG&E Corporation.

Effective October 27, 2020, Atmos Energy and Xcel Energy replaced CenterPoint Energy and NiSource, respectively.

The Dow Jones Utilities is a price-weighted average.

History

The index was created in 1929 when all utility stocks were removed from the Dow Jones Industrial Average.

On April 20, 1965, the index closed at 163.32. On September 13, 1974, the index closed at 57.93.

Annual returns 
The following table shows the price return of the Dow Jones Utility Average, which was calculated back to 1928.

Record values

Investing 
There is no fund that tracks this index. There are funds that have very similar behavior, such as Utilities Select Sector SPDR.

See also
Dow Jones Composite Average

References

External links
Official Website

 
American stock market indices
Stock market indices by industry
1929 establishments in the United States
S&P Dow Jones Indices